This article lists the election results of the Traditional Unionist Voice (TUV) in UK elections. Candidates in bold were elected.

General elections

General election 2010 

Source:

General election 2015 

Source:

General election 2017 

Source:

By-elections

2010-2015 Parliament

European Parliament elections

European election 2009

Source:

European election 2014

Source:

European election 2019

Source:

Northern Ireland Assembly elections

2011 Northern Ireland Assembly election

Source:

2016 Northern Ireland Assembly election

Source:

2017 Northern Ireland Assembly election

Source:

2022 Northern Ireland Assembly election 

Source:

Local elections

2011 Northern Ireland local elections 

Source:

References

Traditional Unionist Voice